The 2014 Korea National League Championship, known as the 2014 Hana Bank National League Championship, was the eleventh competition of the Korea National League Championship.

Group stage

Group A

Group B

Knockout stage

Bracket

Semi-finals

Final

See also
2014 in South Korean football
2014 Korea National League

References

External links

Korea National League Championship seasons
K
Korea National League Championship
Korea National League Championship